Alessio Tramello (1455–1535) was an Italian Renaissance architect who mostly designed churches and civic works.

He began his activity in Piacenza and his work uses forms of Gothic architecture. Two works from Piacenza stand out in design. The first, Santa Maria di Campagna was built (1522–1528), in an example of symmetric centrally-planned Renaissance architecture. He also directed design of the church of San Sisto (1499–1511).

External links
 Discover Italy
 Old Masters
 William Stout Architectural Books
  Opere di Alessio Tramello, architetto piacentino

1455 births
1535 deaths
16th-century Italian architects
Italian ecclesiastical architects